Chalcophora is a genus of beetles in the family Buprestidae, containing the following living species:

 Chalcophora alternans (Abeille de Perrin, 1904)
 Chalcophora anachoreta Szallies, 1991
 Chalcophora angulicollis (LeConte, 1857)
 Chalcophora brasiliensis Obenberger, 1928
 Chalcophora detrita (Klug, 1829)
 Chalcophora fortis LeConte, 1860
 Chalcophora georgiana (LeConte, 1857)
 Chalcophora hondurasica Casey, 1909
 Chalcophora humboldti (Laporte & Gory, 1836)
 Chalcophora intermedia (Rey, 1890)
 Chalcophora japonica (Gory, 1840)
 Chalcophora laevigata Heer, 1862
 Chalcophora liberta (Germar, 1824)
 Chalcophora mariana (Linnaeus, 1758)
 Chalcophora massiliensis (Villers, 1789)
 Chalcophora maura Espanol, 1933
 Chalcophora mexicana Waterhouse, 1882
 Chalcophora pulchella Heer, 1862
 Chalcophora virginiensis (Drury, 1770)
 Chalcophora yunnana Fairmaire, 1888

References

Buprestidae genera